Michael Connolly (1922 – 17 July 2002) was an Irish soccer player during the 1940s.

Career
Connolly played for Bohemians during the 1948/49 and 1949/50 seasons. He was a defensive midfielder who made his final appearance for Bohs on 3 May 1950 against Cork Athletic.

1922 births
2002 deaths
Republic of Ireland association footballers
League of Ireland players
Bohemian F.C. players
Association football wing halves